Oikopleuridae is a family of larvacean tunicates (class Appendicularia).

References 

 Van der Land, J. (2001). Appendicularia, in: Costello, M.J. et al. (Ed.) (2001). European register of marine species: a check-list of the marine species in Europe and a bibliography of guides to their identification. Collection Patrimoines Naturels, 50: pp. 356
 Fenaux, R., Q. Bone, and D. Deibel. 1998. Appendicularian distribution and zoogeography, p. 251-264. In q. Bone [ed.], The biology of pelagic tunicates. Oxford University Press.

External links 

Appendicularia
Tunicate families